Euploea algea, the long branded blue crow, is a butterfly found in India and Southeast Asia that belongs to the crows and tigers, that is, the Danaid group of the brush-footed butterflies family.

See also
Danainae
Nymphalidae
List of butterflies of India
List of butterflies of India (Nymphalidae)

References
 
  
 
 
 
 

Euploea
Butterflies of Asia
Butterflies of Indochina